Wormsley Priory was a monastic house in Herefordshire, England at .

References

Monasteries in Herefordshire